Zarvanytsia  is a village in Zolochiv Raion (district) of Lviv Oblast (province) in western Ukraine. It belongs to Zolochiv urban hromada, one of the hromadas of Ukraine.

References

External links 
  с. Зарваниця, Львівська область, Золочівський район

Villages in Zolochiv Raion, Lviv Oblast